Arthur Joseph Kight (13 October 1901 – 11 May 1987) was an Australian rules footballer who played for the Richmond Football Club in the Victorian Football League (VFL).

His brother, Frank Kight, also played for Richmond a few years after Arthur.

Notes

External links 
		

1901 births
1987 deaths
Australian rules footballers from Victoria (Australia)
Richmond Football Club players